The Saskatchewan Youth Parliament (SYP) is a non-partisan organization of young people that meets to discuss and debate political and social issues. Members learn about the mechanics of government, such as parliamentary procedure, decision making, and the rules of debate in a parliamentary democracy. Additionally, members are exposed to a variety of viewpoints from youth from around Saskatchewan. At its annual Christmas session, SYP members are given the privilege of debating at the Saskatchewan Legislature in Regina, in the same seats as the real Members of the Legislative Assembly. SYP is run for youth by youth by a cabinet elected at the Annual Christmas Session each year. Cabinet does everything from planning the events, to finances and communications.

According to its mission statement:

The Saskatchewan Youth Parliament is a non-partisan, not-for-profit, youth-run organization. SYP provides the opportunity for youth across the province to expand their knowledge of parliamentary procedure while fostering good citizenship.  The organization is dedicated to developing leadership and public speaking skills among youth.  While striving to create an inclusive environment, members forge lasting relationships based on cooperative learning and mutual respect.

History
SYP first met in 1912 as the Saskatchewan Older Boys' Parliament. However, it had a shaky beginning and collapsed after a few years of existence.

In 1923, SYP was revived under the TUXIS movement as an organisation for Christian boys. That Christmas, the session was held at the Saskatchewan Legislature, where it has been held almost every year since.

There were no sessions of the SYP during the Great Depression and World War II. This resulted in a fifteen year gap between the 8th and 9th sessions of the SYP. It was not until 1945 that the SYP met again. At that time, the Saskatchewan Older Boys' Parliament began its evolution towards what is now called SYP. There were many spirited debates on whether to admit females, non-Christians and smokers. The members at the time decided to allow smokers to join but not females or non-Christians.

In 1969, the members of the Saskatchewan Older Boys' Parliament debated a resolution that would permit young women to join the organisation. One of the members at the time was former Saskatchewan premier Lorne Calvert, who gave a (reportedly tongue in cheek) speech against admitting female members. It was not until 1972 that females and non-Christians were allowed to join. At that time, the name was changed to Saskatchewan Youth Parliament.

In 1987, SYP celebrated its 75th Anniversary. To celebrate, a  reunion was held which brought together different generations of SYP alumni. Soon afterward, a new draft constitution and standing orders were prepared. These came into effect in 1988.

In 2012, SYP celebrated its 100th Anniversary with a special reunion in Regina at the Saskatchewan Legislative Building, being the first people in Saskatchewan to use the new green carpet that had been installed in the legislative chamber.

Throughout the years, a number of SYP alumni have become notable political leaders, including former Prime Minister the Right Honourable John Diefenbaker; former Clerk of the Legislature, Clerk of the Senate, Secretary of the University of Saskatchewan, Lieutenant-Governor of Saskatchewan, and former acting President of the University of Saskatchewan, His Honour, the Honourable Dr. Gordon Barnhart;  former MP Simon De Jong; former Federal Cabinet Minister and current Deputy Leader of the Opposition Ralph Goodale; former Premier Lorne Calvert; former MLA and cabinet minister Mark Wartman; and Minister of Environment Ken Cheveldayoff.  Many other former members have also made their mark on Saskatchewan and Canada as lawyers, diplomats, teachers, and journalists.

In light of the Covid-19 Pandemic, SYP took a hiatus given the health concerns in running group events. 

In 2023 SYP is returning. This includes with a chance to have the Annual Session take place over the Family Day Long weekend, rather than the traditional Christmas time period.

Annual events
SYP has four events each year, the biggest being the Annual Session in Regina, Saskatchewan. At Session the members take part in a number of activities, which include debate of resolutions in the Saskatchewan Legislature and cabinet elections. Session is also the opportunity for the organization to debate legislation that affects the operation of the organization, including the annual budget and the acts governing each cabinet portfolio. Session functions as SYP's annual general meeting, and outcomes of legislation debates are binding on the organization.

The topics for debate are chosen by the members themselves at the event and are often related to topics that are of interest or are featured in the news. For example, switching to a nuclear-based energy system was a favourite debate resolution during the early 1990s. Other perennial topics include the death penalty, abortion, and the legalization of marijuana.

The three other events held throughout the year take place in March, May and November. These are called "Minis" because each is held over a weekend is like a miniature Session. The location of the March and May minis vary each year, but tend to be either a North/South town or city or an East/West town or city. Mini debates are of resolutions and not SYP's legislation.

The November Mini is typically held in Saskatoon and is the yearly Tri-Provincial event. Saskatchewan Youth Parliament invites the Youth Parliament of Manitoba and the Alberta Youth Parliament to join them in a weekend of debating.

There are also Cabinet meetings held in January, July and September, as well as at each official event as a time for the Executive Council (Cabinet) to discuss the running of Saskatchewan Youth Parliament. There is also an annual Board meeting of the Chief Returning Officer, Premier and other board members, which includes a report from the Minister of Finance.

List of premiers

The following are the individuals who have been the Premier of Saskatchewan Youth Parliament and the year they served.
 1985 - Scott Banda
 1986 - Kenton Vaughan
 1987 - Angie Banda
 1989 - Ken Millard
 1990 - Scott Quendack
 1991 - Matt Cohen
 1992 - Michael Gange
 1993 - Mary Lou Kowalski
 1994 - Troy Snider
 1995 - Dawn Anhorn
 1996 - Howie Millard
 1997 - Andrew Smith
 1998 - Tricia Kaminski
 1999 - Kurt Gibb
 2000 - Steven "Zeke" Lloyd
 2001 - Nick Hill
 2002 - Angela Zwaagstra
 2003 - Matt Leisle
 2004 - Matt Leisle
 2005 - David Chevrier
 2006 - Arielle Zerr
 2007 - Jennifer Grondin
 2008 - Joren Burton
 2009 - Heather Chevrier
 2010 - Michael Roche
 2011 - Brett Estey
 2012 - Tava Burton
 2013 - David Peters
 2014 - Joseph Chiliak
 2015 - Myles Fuchs
 2016 - Joseph Chiliak
 2017 - Joel Morin
 2018 - Joel Morin

List of speakers

The following are the individuals who have been the Speaker of Saskatchewan Youth Parliament and the year they were Speaker

 1992 - Corey Van Zandbergen
 1993 - Anna Lee Fuhr
 1994 - Michael Anhorn
 1995 - Kris Kinar
 1996 - Aaron Robertson
 1997 - Fletcher Kent
 1998 - Michael Zwaagstra
 1999 - Michael Zwaagstra
 2000 - Kurt Gibb
 2001 - Steven "Zeke" Lloyd
 2002 - Loriel Anderson
 2003 - Angela Zwaagstra
 2004 - Charles Devon
 2005 - Matt Leisle
 2006 - Jennifer Grondin
 2007 - David Chevrier
 2008 - Gillian Gee
 2009 - Jordan Kostal
 2010 - Brett Estey
 2011 - Michael Roche
 2012 - Joey Eremondi
 2013 - Jessica Iris
 2014 - Rebecca Hoiseth/Myles Fuchs
 2015 - Joseph Chiliak
 2016 - Eric Holloway
 2017 - Derek Cameron
 2018 - Austin MacNally

List of leaders of the opposition

The following are the individuals who have been the Leader of the Opposition of Saskatchewan Youth Parliament and the year they were Leader of the Opposition

 2008 - Gina Hochban
 2009 - Jessica Brown
 2010 - Jordan Kostal
 2011 - Daisy Martinez
 2012 - Jordan Sherbino
 2013 - Kabi Eremondi
 2014 - Ben Bushell/Rebecca Hoiseth
 2015 - Eric Holloway
 2016 - Myles Fuchs
 2017 - Madeline Singh
 2018 - Madeline Singh

Notable alum
John Diefenbaker: Prime Minister of Canada
Ralph Goodale: former federal Finance Minister, former federal Minister of Public Safety
Lorne Calvert: former Premier of Saskatchewan
Gordon Barnhart: former President University of Saskatchewan, former Lieutenant Governor of Saskatchewan, former Secretary of the University of Saskatchewan, former Clerk of the Senate of Canada, former Clerk of the Legislature of Saskatchewan
Scott Banda: CEO, Federated Co-operatives
Arielle Zerr: CJME Sports Reporter
Fletcher Kent: Global New Reporter in Edmonton
Michael Zwaagstra: public high school teacher, education researcher and author, deputy mayor of Steinbach, Manitoba
Simon De Jong: former member of Parliament
Ken Cheveldayoff: Current MLA for Saskatoon Willowgrove

See also
 Western Canada Youth Parliament
 Youth Parliament of Canada/Parlement jeunesse du Canada
 History of Youth Work
 Model parliament

References

External links
 Saskatchewan Youth Parliament

Canadian youth parliaments
Organizations based in Regina, Saskatchewan